Alexandra Fuller (born 24 August 1993 in Cape Town) is a South African professional squash player. As of October 2020, she was ranked number 35 in the world.
She is ranked number 1 in South Africa as of October 2020. She is a member of South Africa women's national squash team.

References

1993 births
Living people
South African female squash players
Sportspeople from Cape Town